Independence High School may refer to:
Independence High School (Glendale, Arizona) in Glendale, Arizona
Independence High School (Alhambra, California) in Alhambra, California
Independence High School (Brentwood, California) in Brentwood, California
Independence High School (Bakersfield, California) in Bakersfield, California
Independence High School (Diamond Springs, California) in Diamond Springs, California
Independence High School (Jackson, California) in Jackson, California
Independence High School (Madera, California) in Madera, California
Independence High School (Lake Balboa, Los Angeles, California) in Lake Balboa, Los Angeles
Independence High School (Merced, California) in Merced, California
Independence High School (Roseville, California) in Roseville, California
Independence High School (San Francisco, California) in San Francisco, California
Independence High School (San Jose, California) in San Jose, California
Independence High School (Sutter Creek, California) in Sutter Creek, California
Independence High School (Van Nuys, California) in Van Nuys, California
Independence High School (Wasco, California) in Wasco, California
Independence High School (Alpharetta, Georgia) in Alpharetta, Georgia
Independence High School (Illinois) in Country Club Hills, Illinois
Independence High School (Iowa) in Independence, Iowa
Independence High School (Kansas) in Independence, Kansas
Independence High School (Louisiana) in Independence, Louisiana
Independence High School (Mississippi) in Independence, Mississippi
Independence High School (Nevada) in Elko, Nevada
Independence High School (New Jersey) in Irvington, New Jersey
Independence High School (Charlotte, North Carolina) in Charlotte, North Carolina
Independence High School (Winston-Salem, North Carolina) in Winston-Salem, North Carolina
Independence High School (Columbus, Ohio) in Columbus, Ohio
Independence High School (Independence, Ohio) in Independence, Ohio
Independence High School (Oklahoma)
Independence High School (Tennessee) in Thompson's Station, Tennessee
Independence High School (Frisco, Texas) in Frisco, Texas
Independence High School (Utah) in Provo, Utah
Independence High School (Ashburn, Virginia) in Ashburn, Virginia
Independence High School (West Virginia) in Coal City, West Virginia
Independence High School (Wisconsin) in Independence, Wisconsin
Independence High School (Wyoming) in Rock Springs, Wyoming

See also
Baltimore Independence School, a public charter high school in Baltimore, Maryland